A mercat cross is the Scots name for the market cross found frequently in Scottish cities, towns and villages where historically the right to hold a regular market or fair was granted by the monarch, a bishop or a baron. It therefore served a secular purpose as a symbol of authority, and was an indication of a burgh's relative prosperity. Historically, the term dates from the period before 1707, when the Kingdom of Scotland was an independent state, but it has been applied loosely to later structures built in the traditional architectural style of crosses or structures fulfilling the function of marking a settlement's focal point. Historical documents often refer simply to "the cross" of whichever town or village is mentioned. Today, there are around 126 known examples of extant crosses in Scotland, though the number rises if later imitations are added.

History
The earliest documentary reference occurs in the reign of William the Lion (1165–1214), when it was decreed that "all merchandises sal be presentit at the mercat and mercat croce of burghis". Early town crosses may have continued the tradition of church crosses used to mark consecrated land or sanctuary boundaries, and functioned similarly to early ecclesiastical crosses, from before the building of stone churches, in marking a communal gathering place. They are thought to have been originally pillars of wood, possibly placed on stone bases, changing to stone pillars in later centuries. Some, as at Inverkeithing, incorporate sundials (the pillar of each cross itself acts as a primitive sundial).

The cross was the place around which market stalls would be arranged, and where 'merchants' (Scots for shopkeepers as well as wholesale traders) would gather to discuss business. It was also the spot where state and civic proclamations would be publicly read by the "bellman" (town crier). For example, in 1682 a town guild in Stirling was accorded the privilege of making a proclamation, to be "intimat at the Mercat Croce that no person pretend ignorance." To this day, royal proclamations are still ceremonially read in public at the Mercat Cross in Edinburgh, including the calling of a general election and succession of a new monarch.

The cross was also the communal focal point of public events such as civic ceremonials, official rejoicings, and public shamings and punishments, including executions. Some crosses still incorporate the iron staples to which jougs and branks were once attached. Communal gatherings still take place at crosses, as at Galashiels on "Braw Lads Day" or Peebles at the start of the Beltane Festival. Crosses are often the place to mark the start or end of Common Ridings as at Musselburgh or events such as the Stonehaven fireball ceremony.

Descriptions

Despite the name, the typical mercat cross is not usually cruciform, or at least has not been since the iconoclasm of the Scottish Reformation. The cross atop the shaft may have been replaced with a small statue, such as a royal unicorn or lion, symbols of the Scottish monarchy, or a carved stone displaying the arms of the royal burgh, or, in the cases of ecclesiastical burghs or burghs of barony, the bishop's or feudal superior's coat-of-arms. These are often painted. Another finial commonly seen is a stone ball as at Clackmannan and Newton Stewart. The shaft is usually surmounted by a plain or decorated capital. A variety of decorative designs are employed, including foliage, emblems like thistles and roses, armorial shields, and mouldings of the egg-and-dart type.

Five crosses: at Edinburgh, Dundee, Perth, Aberdeen and Preston (modern Prestonpans) were supported by a drum-shaped understructure, known as a cross-house, with a platform reached by internal steps or ladder. In the case of Aberdeen's late 17th-century cross the platform is supported by a series of open semi-circular arcades. The Preston Cross, built in the early 17th century, is the only one of the type still existing on its original site. This traditional design has been replicated approximately with added Scots baronial elements in Victorian reconstructions at Edinburgh and Perth. A plainer understructure faintly echoing the design was adopted for Glasgow's cross when a replacement was erected on or near the site of the original in 1921; and simpler versions exist elsewhere, as at Elgin and Selkirk.  Most crosses, however, stand on stepped, often octagonal stone bases and are of an average height of between 9 and 13 feet. In some cases, as at Musselburgh (see gallery image) and Kirkcudbright, the pillar is secured within or stands upon a solid stone structure.

Some mercat crosses of today are replicas from the Victorian period, as at Dunfermline and Scone, though they often incorporate one or more original elements, particularly the shaft or a section thereof. Some crosses, as at Linlithgow and St Andrews, were replaced with public drinking fountains substituting for older, demolished crosses, and some were adapted as war memorials after the Great War of 1914–1918. A war memorial may incorporate a part of the original cross, as at Renfrew or Bowden, or have been built deliberately in the style of a mercat cross, as at Lauder and Moffat. The war memorials at Abernethy, North Berwick and Portree also closely resemble mercat crosses and are known as such. The last, of course, lies geographically well outside the historic area of Scottish Lowland burghs. Another example of what might be termed an imitation cross is the war memorial at Dalmeny. It provides the village with a customary focal point and gives the impression that it is much older than its 19th-century origin, but is not indicative of a historical market.

Taken for granted as a normal part of the street scene, crosses have in the main been poorly documented in the past regarding their dates of erection, relocation and remodelling, and they often suffer from neglect in the present. Many no longer stand in their original position. Some, such as Forfar's, and Queensferry's have disappeared, and some, such as Cupar's and Banff's, have been moved to a location outside the burgh but later retrieved and re-erected.

Scottish emigrants to countries such as Canada and especially Australia took the idea of the mercat cross with them, and several cities in the New World have or once had them in the town centre.

List of places with mercat crosses

Aberdeen
Aberlady
Abernethy
Airth
Alloa
Alyth
Anstruther
Banff
Beauly
Biggar
Brechin
Burntisland
Callander
Campbeltown
Canongate
Carnwath
Clackmannan
Cockburnspath
Coldingham
Crail
Crieff
Cullen
Culross
Cumnock
Cupar
Dingwall
Dornoch
Doune
Duffus
Dumfries
Dunbar
Dundee
Dunfermline
Dunkeld
Duns
Edinburgh
Elgin
Errol
Falkirk
Fettercairn
Forres
Fortrose
Fraserburgh
Galashiels
Gifford
Glamis
Glasgow
Haddington
Houston
Inveraray
Inverbervie
Inverkeithing
Inverness
Irvine
Jedburgh
Kilmarnock
Kilmaurs
Kilwinning
Kincardine
Kinross
Kinrossie
Kirkcudbright
Kirkwall
Langholm
Lerwick
Leven
Linlithgow
Lochmaben
Longforgan
Lossiemouth
Luss
Macduff
Maybole
Meikleour
Melrose
Moniaive
Montrose
Musselburgh
Nairn
Newton Stewart
North Berwick
Oban
Oldhamstock
Old Aberdeen
Old Rayne
Old Scone
Ormiston
Peebles
Perth
Pittenweem
Portree
Prestonpans
Prestwick
Renfrew
Rutherglen
St Andrews
Sanquhar
Scone
Selkirk
Stirling
Stonehaven
Swinton
Tain
Thornhill
Turriff
Whithorn
Wick
Wigtown

Gallery

See also 
Mercat Cross, Edinburgh

References

External links

 Mercat Cross
 Rampant Scotland
 Glasgow Mercat Cross
 Scottish Market Crosses: The development of a risk assessment model by Dr. Lindsey J Thomson

Architecture in Scotland
Monuments and memorials in Scotland
Crosses by function